Belarusian Railway (BCh) ( / Biełaruskaja čyhunka) is the national state-owned railway company of Belarus. It operates all of the rail transport network in Belarus. As of 2005, the railway employs 112,173 people.

Overview

The company, formed in 1992 after the dissolution of the Soviet Union, is one of the inheritors of the Soviet Railways. The railway's most important station is Minsk Terminal, the central station of the capital.

BCh reports to the ministry of transport and as of 2010 was composed of 84  organizations; 46 enterprises, 38 institutions, and 7 factories/plants. The rail network is divided into 6 departments: named after the regions around Minsk, Baranovichi, Brest, Gomel, Mogilev and Vitebsk.

Rolling stock
Electric locomotives
ChS4T; Co'Co' electric locomotive
VL80, BCG-1; twin-unit (Bo'Bo')-(Bo'Bo') locomotives

Diesel locomotives
M62, TE10, 2TE116, TEP60, TEP70, ChME3; Co'Co' diesel electric locomotives
TGK2; two-axle diesel shunter

Passenger multiple units
DR1; diesel multiple unit
ER9, Stadler FLIRT (EPg, EPr, EPm); electric multiple units
DP1, DP3, DP6 Pesa; diesel multiple unit for Minsk-Vilnius services.

Stations

Gallery

See also

Minsk Railway station
Rail transport in Belarus

Notes

References

External links
, official website

Companies based in Minsk
Railway companies of Belarus
Government-owned railway companies
Railway companies established in 1992
Railway companies of the Soviet Union
Belarusian brands